The Bickersgracht is a canal in Amsterdam that runs between the Westelijke Eilanden (Western Islands), and a street on one of these islands, Bickerseiland.

Location

The Bickersgracht runs in a north-south direction along the west side of Bickerseiland, between that island and Prinseneiland. 
The Galgenbrug (bridge no. 315) runs across the canal between Galgenstraat on Prinseneiland and Kleine Bickersstraat on Bickerseiland. 
The bridge, originally a double seesaw, now a fixed bridge, was probably called that because there was a good view of the gallows of the Volewijck on the other side of the IJ.

Bickersgracht street does not run along the water but on the other side of the houses along the canal. 
The street is paved with old cobblestones. 
There are seven 17th and 18th century buildings on the Bickersgracht that have been designated as national monuments: six residential houses and Pakhuis de Faam (Bickersgracht 256), a double warehouse from around 1650. 
The De Dierencapel children 's farm is located on the Bickersgracht.

History

The canal is named after the Bicker family of Amsterdam, more specifically Jan Bicker, who bought Bickerseiland in 1631. 
A number of sheds to store timber were erected along the Bickersgracht. 
Warehouses and a large home were built for Bicker on the island. 
These buildings were demolished around 1700 to make way for a series of houses. [1]

See also 
Canals of Amsterdam

Notes

Sources

Canals in Amsterdam